Franz Wagner (23 September 1911 – 8 December 1974, in Vienna) was an Austrian football midfielder.

He earned 18 caps for the Austria national football team and participated in the 1934 FIFA World Cup. After the annexation of Austria by Germany, he earned 3 caps for the Germany national football team, and participated in the 1938 FIFA World Cup. He spent his club career at SK Rapid Wien.

References

1911 births
1974 deaths
Footballers from Vienna
Association football midfielders
Austrian footballers
Austria international footballers
German footballers
Germany international footballers
SK Rapid Wien players
1934 FIFA World Cup players
1938 FIFA World Cup players
Dual internationalists (football)
Austrian football managers
SK Rapid Wien managers